Sreda (Environment) is a production company which produces TV programs and serials for Channel One, Russia-1, NTV, Channel 5, TV Centre, REN TV, STS, TV-3, Friday!, also collaborated with the Ukrainian channels Ukraine, Inter, 1+1 and ICTV, the Belarus channel Belarus-1 and the Kazakh channel Channel One Eurasia. It was founded in June 2008 by Alexander Tsekalo after his departure from the post of deputy general director for special projects of the Channel One.

Until March 31, 2014 the co-owner of the company was producer Ruslan Sorokin.

It is the first TV company in the history of Russian television, which adapted the serial format of the BBC channel (the series The Dark Side of the Moon). In 2016 Sreda adapted another BBC series (Luther), under the title of Klim.

It is also the first Russian television company which managed to sell its series (Silver Spoon) to Netflix. Other series which Netflix acquired from Sreda include The Method, Locust, Fartsa, Territory, and Sparta.

Filmography
TV series
The Dark Side of the Moon (2012)
Silver Spoon (2014–present)
The Method (2015-present)
Fartsa (2015)
Locust (2016)
Klim (2016)
Trotsky (2017)
Territory (2018)
Sparta (2018)
Gogol (film series) (2019)
Sherlock in Russia (2020)
Trigger (2020-present)
Films
Cinderella (2012)
Locust (2015)
TV shows
Big Difference (2008–2014)
Prozhektorperiskhilton (2017–present)

References

External links
Official website

Film production companies of Russia
Russian film studios
Companies based in Moscow
Russian brands
2008 establishments in Russia
Mass media companies established in 2008